A by-election was held for the New South Wales Legislative Assembly electorate of The Clarence on 7 April 1880 following the resignation of Thomas Bawden.

Dates

Results

Thomas Bawden resigned.

See also
Electoral results for the district of Clarence
List of New South Wales state by-elections

References

1880 elections in Australia
New South Wales state by-elections
1880s in New South Wales